Biratpur is a village and panchayat located in the Sonbarsa Raj block, Saharsa District, Bihar state. It belongs to Kosi Division.

References 

1. http://dspace.wbpublibnet.gov.in:8080/jspui/bitstream/10689/13066/6/Chapter%20I-III_1-58p.pdf

2. https://books.google.com/books?id=ddsA_RIgg78C&pg=PA170&dq=gandhwaria&hl=en&sa=X&ei=DzNIVIKtD9CkuQTg7oGYCw&ved=0CBsQ6AEwAA#v=onepage&q=gandhwaria& f=false
  
3.https://books.google.com/books?id=DStuAAAAMAAJ&q=gandhwaria&dq=gandhwaria&hl=en&sa=X&ei=DzNIVIKtD9CkuQTg7oGYCw&ved=0CCEQ6AEwAQ]

Villages in Saharsa district